Geryon is a genus of crabs belonging to the family Geryonidae.

The species of this genus are found in Europe and Northern America.

Species:

Geryon longipes 
Geryon trispinosus

References

Crabs